Isidoro Díaz Mejía (born 14 March 1938) is a Mexican former professional footballer who played as a midfielder.

Club career
Isidoro Díaz played most of his club career for Guadalajara, where he won 15 titles, including 7 league titles and the first ever edition of the CONCACAF Champions' Cup in 1962.

International career
He represented Mexico in three World Cups (1962, 1966 and 1970). He made 68 appearances for the Mexico national team between 1960 and 1970.

Honours
Guadalajara
CONCACAF Champions' Cup: 1962
Mexican Primera División: 1956–57, 1958–59, 1959–60, 1960–61, 1961–62 1963–64, 1965–1966
Mexican Champions Cup: 1956–57, 1958–59, 1959–60, 1960–61, 1963–64, 1964–65
Mexican Cup: 1963

Career statistics

International goals

|- 
| 1. || March 19, 1960 || San José, Costa Rica ||  || 3–0 || Win || 1960 Panamerican Cup
|- 
| 2. || June 26, 1960 || Mexico City, Mexico ||  || 3–1 || Win || Friendly
|- 
| 3. || November 13, 1960 || Mexico City, Mexico ||  || 3–0 || Win || 1962 FIFA World Cup qualification
|- 
| 4. || June 7, 1962 || Viña del Mar, Chile ||  || 3–1 || Win || 1962 FIFA World Cup
|- 
| 5. || March 28, 1963 || Santa Ana, El Salvador ||  || 8–0 || Win || 1963 CONCACAF Championship
|- 
| 6. || March 28, 1963 || Santa Ana, El Salvador ||  || 8–0 || Win || 1963 CONCACAF Championship
|- 
| 7. || February 28, 1965 || San Pedro Sula, Honduras ||  || 1–0 || Win || 1966 FIFA World Cup qualification
|-
| 8. || March 12, 1965 || Mexico City, Mexico  ||  || 2–0 || Win || 1966 FIFA World Cup qualification
|- 
| 9. || March 28, 1965 || Guatemala City, Guatemala ||  || 2–0 || Win || 1965 CONCACAF Championship
|- 
| 10. || May 7, 1965 || Mexico City, Mexico ||  || 8–0 || Win || 1966 FIFA World Cup qualification
|- 
| 11. || May 7, 1965 || Mexico City, Mexico ||  || 8–0 || Win || 1966 FIFA World Cup qualification
|- 
| 12. || May 7, 1965 || Mexico City, Mexico ||  || 8–0 || Win || 1966 FIFA World Cup qualification
|- 
| 13. || October 6, 1968 || Puebla, Mexico ||  || 1–1 || Draw || Friendly
|- 
| 14. || October 31, 1968 || Rio de Janeiro, Brazil ||  || 2–1 || Win || Friendly 
|- 
| 15. || February 15, 1970 || Mexico City, Mexico ||  || 1–1 || Draw || Friendly
|- 
| 16. || April 22, 1970 || Mexico City, Mexico ||  || 1–1 || Draw || Friendly
|- 
| 17. || April 29, 1970 || León, Mexico ||  || 4–2 || Win || Friendly
|}

References

External links
 

1938 births
Living people
Footballers from Jalisco
Association football midfielders
Mexico international footballers
1962 FIFA World Cup players
1966 FIFA World Cup players
1970 FIFA World Cup players
C.D. Guadalajara footballers
Club León footballers
Liga MX players
Mexican footballers